International Molders and Foundry Workers Union of North America was an affiliated trade union of the AFL–CIO. The union traced its roots back to the formation of the Iron Molders' Union of North America, established in 1859 to represent craftsmen who cast wrought iron metal products. It is now part of the GMP International Union.

Organizational history

Formation
In the years prior to the American Civil War existing organization of workers in the iron industry was established on the basis of independent local groups. In 1859, there came a move to forming a national organization in the United States, and the Iron Molders' Union was established at a convention held in Philadelphia on July 5.

The first national convention was attended by 35 delegates, representing local iron molders organizations located throughout the Northeast and as far west as St. Louis. William C. Rea of Missouri was elected the first president of the organization and a committee of five headed by William H. Sylvis of Pennsylvania was appointed to prepare a declaration to the iron workers of America.

The Molders' Union initially took the form of a loose federation of already existing local organizations, each retaining almost complete autonomy.

Initial dues were set by the organization at $10 per local with an additional $10 per delegate sent to the national convention. This proved insufficient and in 1860 per capita dues were initiated at the rate of 5 cents per member per year. This still proved insufficient for the maintenance of a central office and dues were hiked in 1867 to 50 cents per quarter per member and again in 1872 to 25 cents per month.

The organization grew rapidly during the years of the Civil War, with non-union journeymen joining in great numbers. By 1866, the Iron Molders' Union touted 137 locals with a total membership of just under 10,000.

Mergers
A series of mergers led the union to change its name to the International Molders and Allied Workers Union.

In 1988, the Molders and Allied Workers merged with the Glass, Pottery, Plastics and Allied Workers International Union (GPPA) to create the Glass, Molders, Pottery, Plastics and Allied Workers International Union (GMP).

Presidents
1859: William C. Rea
1860: Isaac J. Neall
1861: Norman Van Alstyne
1863: William H. Sylvis
1869: F. J. Meyers
1870: William Saffin
1879: Patrick J. Fitzpatrick
1890: Martin Fox
1903: Joseph F. Valentine
1924: Michael Keough
1932: Lawrence O'Keefe
1938: A. J. Prendergast
1939: Harry Stevenson
1948: Chester Sample
1960: William Lazzerini
1971: Draper Doyal
1976: Carl W. Studenroth
1984: Bernard Butsavage

Footnotes

External links

 Glass, Molders, Pottery, Plastics & Allied Workers International Union

AFL–CIO
Foundry workers' trade unions
Defunct trade unions in the United States
Trade unions established in 1859
1859 establishments in Pennsylvania